Charlotte Sophie Bentinck   is a 1996 Dutch historical drama film directed by Ben Verbong.

Cast
Nanette Kuijpers - Charlotte Sophie
Dick van Duin - Willem Bentinck
Hiske van der Linden - Lottgen
Tom Jansen - Albrecht
Ellen Vogel - Wilhelmine
Edda Barends - Cordier
Carol van Herwijnen - van Boetzelaer
Gerard Thoolen - Stadhouder Willem IV

External links 
 

Dutch drama films
1996 films
1990s Dutch-language films
Films directed by Ben Verbong